Gromnik  is a village in Tarnów County, Lesser Poland Voivodeship, in southern Poland. It is the seat of the gmina (administrative district) called Gmina Gromnik.

The village has a population of 3,285.

References

Villages in Tarnów County